SV-Wigo-Feldkirchen are an Austrian association football
club founded in 1948 and was playing in the Austrian Regional League Central in several times. During 2008/2009 season, they finished runners-up in 2007/2008 season with 50 points. Since 2013/14, they play in the "Kärntner Liga" (4th Division).

Current squad

Staff and board members

 Goalkeeper coach:  Christian Dietrichsteiner
 Groundsman: John Koch
 President:  Gottfried Zwatz
 Treasurer:  John Malle

External links
 http://www.sv-wigo.feldkirchen.com/  Official Website

Association football clubs established in 1948
Football clubs in Austria
1948 establishments in Austria